Montils is a commune in the Charente-Maritime department in southwestern France. The 17th–18th actor Louis Deseschaliers was born in Montils.

Geography
The Seugne flows north-northwest through the western part of the commune.

Population

See also
 Communes of the Charente-Maritime department

References

External links
 

Communes of Charente-Maritime